Three Counties railway station is a disused railway station near Arlesey in Bedfordshire, England. It served the southern environs of Arlesey. These included the Three Counties Lunatic Asylum, which was finally subsequently known as the Fairfield Hospital. The station was north of Hitchin on the "London-Peterborough" line. It opened in 1866, and closed to passengers in 1959.

History

The station was opened by the Great Northern Railway (GNR) on 1 April 1866, originally being named Arlesey Siding. On 1 July 1886, the station was renamed Three Counties, taking its new name from the nearby Three Counties Asylum, which itself was so named because it was a joint project of three counties - Hertfordshire, Bedfordshire and Huntingdonshire.

The GNR became part of the London and North Eastern Railway during the Grouping of 1923. The station then passed on to the Eastern Region of British Railways on nationalisation in 1948.

The station was closed to passengers, together with the adjacent Arlesey station, on 5 January 1959 and goods on 28 November 1960. This was due to declining receipts. Arlesey, however, later re-opened.

Notes

References

External links
 Station on navigable O.S. map

Disused railway stations in Bedfordshire
Former Great Northern Railway stations
Railway stations in Great Britain opened in 1866
Railway stations in Great Britain closed in 1959
1866 establishments in England